Big Creek is a  stream in the central Great Plains of North America. It is a tributary of the Smoky Hill River, and the entirety of its length lies in the U.S. state of Kansas.

Geography
Big Creek originates in the High Plains of northwestern Kansas. Its source lies in extreme northwestern Gove County. From there, it flows generally east-southeast through the Smoky Hills to its confluence with the Smoky Hill River in southwestern Russell County.

In Ellis County, Kansas, Big Creek flows through the cities of Ellis and Hays. In Ellis, it is dammed to maintain a small reservoir, Big Creek Lake. In Hays, the creek runs through the campus of Fort Hays State University.

See also
List of rivers of Kansas

References

Rivers of Kansas
Rivers of Gove County, Kansas
Rivers of Russell County, Kansas
Rivers of Ellis County, Kansas